St. Angela is a German television series.

See also
List of German television series

1997 German television series debuts
2005 German television series endings
German medical television series
German-language television shows
Das Erste original programming